Cyclopia can refer to:
 Cyclopia, a congenital disorder
 Cyclopia (plant), a genus of leguminous plants in the subfamily Faboideae